Janz is a line of premium (costing up to 25,000 Euros), low volume (less than one hundred per year) revolvers manufactured by Janz-Präzisionstechnik GmbH, of Bad Malente, Holstein, Germany.

History
Janz-Präzisionstechnik GmbH originally produced a number of parts for the company Korth-Ratzeburg. In the 1990s Korth was bankrupt and production ceased, prompting Janz to start manufacturing revolvers under their own brand in 1997, utilizing frames and parts produced for Korth.

Current products

Revolver

 EM frame - Small frame in calibers from .22 lr to .44 MAG with barrel lengths from 2 1/2 inches to 12 inches. Available with a quick change system.
 E frame - Medium framed from .22 lr to .454 Casull with barrel lengths from 2 1/2 inches to 12 inches. Available with a quick change system.
 MA frame - Large frame in .460 and .500 S+W with barrel lengths from  4" to 12"
 Type S and EM-S Medium and Small frames with a common frame which can use various interchangeable barrels (2½ to 12 inches) and various caliber cylinders.
 Sport revolvers, in either .357 or .44 magnum, equipped with adjustable sights.

Semiautomatics
Janz also produces a 9 mm semiautomatic as the Janz-Schuknecht Pistole.

See also
Other German revolver brands:
 Korth
 Arminius
 Röhm (defunct)

References

External links
 Janz official page
 US page

Revolvers of Germany
Firearm manufacturers of Germany